Waking Up may refer to:

 Waking up, emerging from sleep

Music

Albums
 Waking Up (Bethany Dillon album), and the title song, 2007
 Waking Up (OneRepublic album), and the title song, 2009
 Waking Up (Topper Headon album), 1986

Songs
 "Waking Up" (song), by Elastica, 1995
 "Waking Up", by 10 Years from The Autumn Effect, 2005 
 "Waking Up", by Bethany Dillon from Waking Up, 2007
 "Waking Up", by Bitter:Sweet from Drama, 2008
 "Waking Up", by Eels from Earth to Dora, 2020
 "Waking Up", by Funeral for a Friend from Casually Dressed & Deep in Conversation, 2003
 "Waking Up", by M83 from Oblivion: Original Motion Picture Soundtrack, 2013
 "Waking Up", by Matt Brouwer from Writing to Remember, 2014
 "Waking Up", by OneRepublic from Waking Up, 2009
 "Waking Up", by Starset from Divisions, 2019
 "Waking Up", by We the Kingdom from Holy Water, 2020

Other uses
 Waking Up: A Guide to Spirituality Without Religion, a book by Sam Harris, 2014
Waking Up, his meditation app, 2018
Waking Up, his podcast started in 2013, renamed "Making Sense" in 2019 to differentiate it from his meditation app

See also
 Waking up early, a productivity method
 Wake Up (disambiguation)